The Fish Creek Bridge is a historic structure that was originally located east of Salem, Iowa, United States. It is a small-scale, wrought-iron bridge that the Henry County Board of Supervisors bought from the George E. King Bridge Company of Des Moines in 1893 for $410.80. It was believed to have been fabricated by their parent company, King Iron Bridge Company of Cleveland, and assembled by local laborers. Its historical significance derived from its being an uncommon variant of the Pratt truss. It was listed on the National Register of Historic Places in 1998. Subsequently, the bridge has been replaced at its original location, and the historic structure was moved to Oakland Mills Park.

See also
 
 
 
 
 List of bridges on the National Register of Historic Places in Iowa
 National Register of Historic Places listings in Cerro Gordo County, Iowa

References

Bridges completed in 1894
Bridges in Henry County, Iowa
National Register of Historic Places in Henry County, Iowa
Road bridges on the National Register of Historic Places in Iowa
Wrought iron bridges in the United States
Pratt truss bridges in the United States